Lophocoronoidea is a superfamily of insects in the order Lepidoptera. There is a single extant genus, Lophocorona, in the family Lophocoronidae. These are small, primitive nocturnal moths restricted to Australia whose biology is largely unknown (Common, 1990; Kristensen and Nielsen, 1996; Kristensen, 1999).

A fossil genus Acanthocorona is known from the Burmese amber of Myanmar, dating to the early Cenomanian stage of the Late Cretaceous, approximately 99 million years ago.

Fossil species 

 Acanthocorona Mey, Léger & Lien, 2021
 A. skalskii (type)
 A. muelleri
 A. bowangi
 A. wichardi
 A. kuranishii
 A. sattleri
 A. spinifera

References

Common, I.F.B., (1990). Moths of Australia. 535 pages.
Kristensen, N.P. (1999). The homoneurous Glossata. Ch. 5, pp. 51–64 in Kristensen, N.P. (Ed.). Lepidoptera, Moths and Butterflies. Volume 1: Evolution, Systematics, and Biogeography. Handbuch der Zoologie. Eine Naturgeschichte der Stämme des Tierreiches / Handbook of Zoology. A Natural History of the phyla of the Animal Kingdom. Band / Volume IV Arthropoda: Insecta Teilband / Part 35: 491 pp. Walter de Gruyter, Berlin, New York.
Nielsen, E. S. and Kristensen, N. P. (1996). The Australian moth family Lophocoronidae and the basal phylogeny of the Lepidoptera Glossata. Invertebrate Taxonomy, 10: 1199-1302.Abstract

Sources
Firefly Encyclopedia of Insects and Spiders, edited by Christopher O'Toole, 2002

External links

Tree of Life
 
Australian Lophocoronidae
Lophocorona pediasia
Australia's lophocoronid moths: evolution and conservation

 
Lepidoptera superfamilies
Moths of Australia
Endemic fauna of Australia
Coelolepida